The Jurupa Mountains, or Jurupa Hills, are a small mountain range of the Peninsular Ranges System, located in the southeastern Pomona Valley, within northwestern Riverside County and southwestern San Bernardino County of the Inland Empire region, southern California.

Geography 
It and the range draw their name from the Rancho Jurupa, an 1838 Mexican land grant, and one of the earliest permanent settlements in the area.

The southern slopes of the range descend into the city of Jurupa Valley and the Pomona Freeway (State Route 60) in Riverside County. The northern slopes descend into the city of Fontana and the community of Declezville in San Bernardino County.

The Pedley Hills are nearby on the eastern side of the Jurupa Mountains, and the Pomona Valley wraps around their northern and western sides.

Points of interest
Stringfellow Acid Pits, a major toxic waste and EPA Superfund site, located in Pyrite Canyon on the southern face of the hills.
Jurupa Mountains Discovery Center is a local nature preserve, and home of the Ruth and Sam Kirkby Earth Science Museum and the Granite Hill Nursery, located at the just off the Pomona Freeway.
Martin Tudor Jurupa Hills Regional Park, of the city of Fontana, is on their north slope.
Southridge Village Open Space Reserve  RecreationParks.net: Southridge Village Open Space Reserve, in Fontana. 
Quarry Hill Golf Club, on their eastern slope.

See also
List of Riverside County, California, placename etymologies#Jurupa

References

External links
Jurupa Mountains Discovery Center: Homepage
Jurupa Mountains Discovery Center: Science Museum

Mountain ranges of Riverside County, California
Peninsular Ranges
Fontana, California
Jurupa Valley, California
Pomona Valley
Mountain ranges of Southern California